Sporting Triangles is a British game show that aired on ITV from 7 January 1987 to 13 August 1990. It was originally hosted by Nick Owen for the first two series and then hosted by Andy Craig for the last two series.

Transmission guide
Series 1: 12 editions 7 January 1987 – 25 March 1987
Series 2: 12 editions 7 January 1988 – 31 March 1988
Series 3: 12 editions 19 April 1989 – 12 July 1989
Series 4: 16 editions 12 April 1990 – 13 August 1990
Special Christmas edition : 24 December 1987
These are based on London transmission dates.

Video game
A video game of the series was also published by CDS Micro Systems in 1989 for the Acorn Archimedes, Acorn Electron, Amstrad CPC, BBC Micro, Commodore 64, ZX Spectrum, and Amstrad PCW. The game received low to average scores across several magazines: Your Sinclair rated the game 40% whilst rival Spectrum magazine Crash gave it 48%, stating: "A mediocre conversion of a less than brilliant TV quiz and for sports fanatics only".

References

External links

1987 British television series debuts
1990 British television series endings
1980s British game shows
1990s British game shows
English-language television shows
ITV game shows
Television series by ITV Studios
Television shows produced by Central Independent Television